Torre Jaume I is a 107-metre (351 feet) high steel truss tower in Barcelona, Catalonia, Spain, which was built in 1931 by Carlos Boigas. The tower is currently the fifth-tallest aerial lift pylon in the world, and is a part of the Port Vell Aerial Tramway from Torre Sant Sebastia to Montjuïc. Torre Jaume I also has an observation platform.

See also
 List of towers
 Aerial lift pylon

External links

 Profile of the tower at emporis
 Scale drawing of the tower at skyscraperpge
 

Buildings and structures in Barcelona
Towers completed in 1931
Towers in Catalonia
1931 establishments in Spain